Natural Essence is  the debut album by American saxophonist Tyrone Washington featuring performances recorded in 1967 and released on the Blue Note label.

Reception
The Allmusic review by Ken Dryden awarded the album 4½ stars stating "Only 23 at the time of the recording, the tenor saxophonist composed six originals and is joined by other promising young lions who went onto great careers... Washington shows the influence of John Coltrane during his rapid-fire runs, while his playing during his more straight-ahead works proves to be more memorable".

Track listing
All compositions by Tyrone Washington
 "Natural Essence" - 5:01
 "Yearning for Love" - 6:27
 "Positive Path" - 8:06
 "Soul Dance" - 8:02
 "Ethos" - 6:14
 "Song of Peace" - 5:11
Recorded at Rudy Van Gelder Studio in Englewood Cliffs, New Jersey on December 29, 1967

Personnel
Tyrone Washington - tenor saxophone
Woody Shaw - trumpet (tracks 1-5)
James Spaulding - alto saxophone, flute (tracks 1-5)
Kenny Barron - piano (tracks 1-5)
Reggie Workman - bass
Joe Chambers - drums

References

Blue Note Records albums
Tyrone Washington (musician) albums
1968 debut albums
Albums recorded at Van Gelder Studio
Albums produced by Alfred Lion